Aidondla Aidu is a 2011 Indian Kannada language anthology drama film directed by V. K. Prakash and produced by Vachan Shetty and Sujitha Prakash. The film is based on the extracts from 18 Natakangal, a Sahitya Akademi award-winning collection of short stories written by Jayaprakash Kuloor. The story is centered on man-woman relationships, which is weaved into a single story encapsulating the struggles of a filmmaker, exploring different facets of the institution called marriage.

The film released on 16 September 2011 across Karnataka and was later remade in Malayalam as Poppins. The film met critical appraisals however commercially it could not be successful.

Plot
Totally, there are four short stories told in the film. The first story is called "Payasa", the second "Kannadi", third is about a veteran actor played by Devaraj and fourth is called "Soruva Mane". All the tales revolve around the relationships between a husband and wife and although each explores different facets of the marital relationship, at their core they involve communication and the consequences of misconception.

Cast 
 Dileep Raj
 Vrinda Samartha
 Harish Raj
 Nithya Menen
 Padmapriya
 Ajith Hande
 Apoorva Kasaravalli
 Devaraj
 Shruti
 C. R. Simha
 Sihi Kahi Chandru
 Veena Bhat
 Ravishankar

Soundtrack 

A total of 5 music composers teamed up to score the music for this film containing 4 different short stories. While Sudhakar Bannanje was the sole lyric writer for all the songs except one, Yogesh wrote for one single song. The composers include Ousepachan, Vijay Prakash, Alphonse Joseph, Abhijith & Jyothi Balakrishnan and Balamurali most of whom are the Malayalam film music directors. The audio launch happened at Bangalore with eminent director T. S. Nagabharana as the chief guest.

Awards
 Karnataka State Film Award for Best Editor - Suresh Urs

References

External links

Further reading 

 Cinema Chat about Aidondla Aidu

2011 films
Indian anthology films
Indian drama films
2011 drama films
Films based on short fiction
Kannada films remade in other languages
Films directed by V. K. Prakash
2010s Kannada-language films